NSYNC is the debut studio album by American boy band NSYNC, initially released in Germany on May 26, 1997 by Trans Continental Records and internationally on March 24, 1998 by RCA Records. Following the success of the album's initial release, with singles "I Want You Back" and "Tearin' Up My Heart" reaching the top ten on the Official German Charts, and the album reaching number one on the Offizielle Top 100.

The album has since sold over 15 million copies worldwide, with the album earning a diamond certification in the US, as well as peaking at number two on the Billboard 200.

Background

Band formation
In 1995, Chris Kirkpatrick met with Lou Pearlman to talk about forming a pop group. Pearlman said that he would finance the group if Kirkpatrick would find other young male singers to be with him in the band. This prompted Kirkpatrick to start forming the group, so he called Justin Timberlake who had been a member of the Mickey Mouse Club. Justin joined and recommended his friend Joshua "JC" Chasez, who also was a cast member on the Mickey Mouse Club. Later, the three bumped into Joey Fatone, whom they all knew, at a club and he became the fourth member to join.

Initially, Jason Galasso was chosen as the group's bass singer and fifth member. After several weeks of rehearsals, the group set up a showcase and began planning to officially sign with Pearlman's Trans Continental Label. However, at the last minute, Galasso dropped out as he was not fond of the group's musical direction, claiming that being a teen idol was never a goal of his. The group started to search for people to replace Galasso. Timberlake soon called his vocal coach, who suggested a 16-year-old from Mississippi named Lance Bass, who flew to Orlando to audition and was immediately accepted into the group.

Recording
The newly-formed group began recording demos in closets, which eventually became "Sailing" and "Giddy Up". NSYNC were given an offer to record in Shaquille O'Neal's house in Orlando after he heard them sing the national anthem. During the production of "Sailing", an instrumental was placed before NSYNC started layering the track with harmonies and vocals, while "Giddy Up" was created from a vocal jam session through a computer. The band also recorded in the studio of producer Veit Renn, who used mattresses to create a soundproof environment.

Eventually, the group signed to BMG Ariola Munich, and were sent to Stockholm to begin working on their debut album with the help of producers such as Denniz Pop, Max Martin and Andreas Carlsson around July–August 1996. Initially, the band were recording songs similar to that of Boyz II Men, but had to switch their sound in order to accommodate to the dance-oriented European market. Due to his fascination of Robyn's sound, Pop decided to incorporate Robyn's style into NSYNC's music by combining their R&B vocals with pop tracks.

Singles

Initial release
The album's official lead single, "I Want You Back", was released in Germany on October 4, 1996, and reached the top 10 on November 18, 1996. The group's second single, "Tearin' Up My Heart", was released on February 10, 1997, also peaking within the top 10. The third single, "Here We Go", was released on May 5, 1997, just three weeks prior to the release of the album, to similar success. Their self-titled debut album was then released by BMG Ariola Munich on May 26, 1997, which peaked at number one on the second week of release in Germany. The group soon became an overnight success throughout much of Europe. The album also charted successfully in both Switzerland and Austria eventually selling 820,000 units in GSA (Germany, Switzerland, Austria) region and Eastern Europe. Two further singles, "For the Girl Who Has Everything" and "Together Again", were subsequently released on August 18 and November 3, 1997, respectively, achieving success in Germany and other European territories.

International breakthrough
Following their success of their début album in several European territories, the band captured the attention of Vincent DeGiorgio, an A&R rep for RCA Records. After watching the group perform a rendition of their single "Together Again" in Budapest in November 1997, he offered them a record deal with RCA, which the group immediately agreed to. On January 20, 1998, their first German single, "I Want You Back", was released in both the United Kingdom and the United States, becoming their first single in both territories, achieving success on both the UK Singles Chart and the Billboard Hot 100. Around this time, RCA Records announced that they wished to release the group's debut album, which was previously only released in Germany, in both the U.K. and the U.S., however, wanted to make adjustments to suit both markets. This resulted in the tracks "Riddle", "Best of My Life", "More Than a Feeling", "Together Again" and "Forever Young" being cut altogether, and new mixes of "I Want You Back", "Tearin' Up My Heart" and "For the Girl Who Has Everything" being recorded. The new version of the album also included four new tracks: "I Just Wanna Be with You", "(God Must Have Spent) A Little More Time on You", "Everything I Own", "Thinking of You (I Drive Myself Crazy)". This version of the album was subsequently released in the United States on March 24, 1998.

On June 30, 1998, the group's second German single, "Tearin' Up My Heart", was released in both the U.K. and the U.S., once again achieving success on both charts. Further edits were made for the British version of the album, including remixes of "Thinking of You (I Drive Myself Crazy)", "(God Must Have Spent) A Little More Time on You" and "For the Girl Who Has Everything", plus an all-new track, "U Drive Me Crazy", written exclusively for the British market. This version of the album was released in the UK on July 5, 1998. At first, sales of the album were mediocre in both British and American territories, until the band's worldwide broadcast Disney Channel in Concert special in 1998. After the concert was aired, sales of the album began to skyrocket. It reached number two on the Billboard 200 and shipped over 10 million copies in the United States alone, making it certified 10× Platinum and earning the group an RIAA diamond award. On February 9, 1999, a third single from the new version of the album, "(God Must Have Spent) A Little More Time on You", was released exclusively in the United States, peaking at #8 on the Billboard Hot 100. "Thinking of You (I Drive Myself Crazy)", the final single, was released days later. Though "I Drive Myself Crazy" did not crack the top 40 on Billboard, its music video was in heavy rotation on MTV show TRL, spending a total of 40 days in the number 1 position. The group then went on to become the #3 top-selling boy-band group of all time.

Commercial performance

The album debuted at number eighty two on the Billboard 200 the week of April 11, 1998, with sales of approximately 14,000 units. After six months, on October 10, 1998, the album reached and peaked at number 2 on the chart and remained on it for one hundred and nine weeks.
It spent a total of thirty weeks inside the top 10. The album spent three weeks at number 2 from September 1998 to January 1999. It peaked behind three different number-one blockbuster albums: Lauryn Hill's The Miseducation of Lauryn Hill, Garth Brooks' Double Live and Britney Spears' ...Baby One More Time. According to Nielsen SoundScan, it was the fifth best selling record of 1998 in the United States with 4,400,000 copies sold. The album was certified ten times platinum by the RIAA on January 5, 2000, denoting shipments of ten millions. The album has sold 9,854,000 copies in the US according to Nielsen Music (as of March, 2015) with an additional 1.50 million units at the BMG Music Club (as of early 2003). In the United Kingdom the album debuted and peaked at number 30 on July 11, 1999, and remained on the chart for only three weeks. Worldwide, the album has sold 15,540,000 copies.

The album was ranked as the 137th best album of all time on the Billboard Top 200 Albums of All Time.

Track listing
Lead vocals provided by JC Chasez and Justin Timberlake except on "Thinking of You (I Drive Myself Crazy)", where Justin sings lead on the opening verses followed by Chris Kirkpatrick and Joey Fatone on "Together Again", where Chris & Justin sing lead.

Notes
 signifies an additional producer
"I Just Wanna Be with You" contains portions of "Family Affair", as written by Sly Stone.

Charts

Weekly charts

Year-end charts

Decade-end charts

Certifications and sales

Release history

See also
List of best-selling albums in the United States

Notes

References

1997 debut albums
NSYNC albums
RCA Records albums
Albums produced by Max Martin
Albums produced by Carl Sturken and Evan Rogers
Albums produced by Kristian Lundin
Albums produced by Denniz Pop